Gimme Gimme may refer to:

"Gimme Gimme" (Inna song), 2017
"Gimme Gimme" (Whigfield song), 1996
"Yurayura/Gimme Gimme", 2010 single by Beni 
"Gimme Gimme", a song from Shihad's 1996 album Killjoy
"Gimme Gimme", song from the musical Thoroughly Modern Millie

See also
Gimme (disambiguation)
Gimme Gimme Gimme (disambiguation)
Me First and the Gimme Gimmes
Gimme More, 2007 single by Britney Spears